Our Lady of Sorrows is a historic Catholic Church located in West River, Maryland.

History
Our Lady of Sorrows was originally a country mission church, dedicated as Our Lady of Dolors, but was later anglicized as Our Lady of Sorrows. The original church was founded in 1866 and was built of wood frame construction. It was staffed by Redemptorist priests until 1890 when the Marist Fathers took over. The church underwent a number of restorations and enlargements over the years but was eventually demolished in 1951 to make way for a new church, built of brick in the Georgian style.

Burials
Among those buried in the churchyard of Our Lady of Sorrows Catholic Church is the wealthy planter Captain George Biscoe Steuart. Steuart was the father of the Maryland physician George Hume Steuart (physician), and the grandfather of the diplomat George Hume Steuart (diplomat).

Notes

External links
Official Site Retrieved 8 February 2019

Georgian architecture in Maryland
Roman Catholic churches in Maryland